Free to Love is a 1925 American silent drama film directed by Frank O'Connor. The film stars Clara Bow and Donald Keith.

Plot
As described in a film magazine review, after threatening him with a gun but relenting, Marie Anthony, who was recently released from a reformatory, is adopted by Judge Orr and becomes the fiancée of the young minister James Crawford, who intends to assist former convicts. Gang leader Jack Garner, who threatens to disclose what he knows of her past, succeeds in temporarily separating the lovers. Tony, a hunchback that Marie has befriended, warns her that Crawford's father is a confederate of criminals. Trying to shield the latter, Marie is arrested and accused of murder when Tony kills Garner, but is released when Tony later confesses. The senior Crawford commits suicide. Marie and her lover are reunited.

Cast

Preservation
As well as being available on DVD, a copy of Free to Love is held at UCLA Film and Television Archive.

References

External links

1925 films
American silent feature films
American black-and-white films
1925 drama films
Silent American drama films
Films produced by B. P. Schulberg
Preferred Pictures films
Films directed by Frank O'Connor
1920s American films